Jin Xiangqian (born 18 March 1997) is a Chinese racewalker. In 2018, he won the bronze medal in the men's 20 kilometres walk at the 2018 Asian Games held in Jakarta, Indonesia.

In 2017, he competed in the men's 20 kilometres walk at the 2017 World Championships in Athletics held in London, United Kingdom. He finished in 19th place.

References

External links 
 

Living people
1997 births
Chinese male racewalkers
Athletes (track and field) at the 2018 Asian Games
Asian Games bronze medalists for China
Medalists at the 2018 Asian Games
World Athletics Championships athletes for China
Asian Games medalists in athletics (track and field)